The second season of Workin' Moms, the Canadian comedy television series, was renewed by CBC on April 4, 2017.

Workin' Moms is a Canadian television sitcom whose second season premiered on CBC Television on December 19, 2017. The show stars Catherine Reitman, Dani Kind, and Juno Rinaldi, with Jessalyn Wanlim being demoted to recurring status from season one.  as a group of friends dealing with the challenges of being working mothers. The series is produced by Wolf + Rabbit Entertainment, the production company of Reitman and her husband, Philip Sternberg.

Cast

Starring
 Catherine Reitman as Kate Foster
 Dani Kind as Anne Carlson
 Juno Rinaldi as Frankie Coyne
 Philip Sternberg as Nathan Foster
 Ryan Belleville as Lionel Carlson
 Sadie Munroe as Alice Carlson
 Dennis Andres as Ian Matthews

Recurring
 Jessalyn Wanlim as Jenny Matthews
 Sarah McVie as Valerie "Val" Szalinsky
 Katherine Barrell as Alicia Rutherford
 Peter Keleghan as Richard Greenwood
 Nikki Duval as Rosie Phillips
 Kevin Vidal as Mo Daniels
 Oluniké Adeliyi as Giselle Bois
 Jess Salgueiro as Mean Nanny/Renya
 Jennifer Pudavick as Gena Morris
 Amanda Brugel as Sonia
 Aviva Mongillo as Juniper

Guest
 Jann Arden as Jane Carlson
 Mary Ashton as Sarah Hoffman
 Alden Adair as Marvin Grimes
 Tennille Read as Bianca Thomas

Episodes

Reception
On Rotten Tomatoes, season 2 has an approval rating of 91% based on reviews from 34 critics.

References

External links
 
 

Workin' Moms
2017 Canadian television series debuts
2010s Canadian workplace comedy television series
2017 Canadian television seasons
2018 Canadian television seasons